Matthew Turnbull Simm (4 January 1869 – 8 October 1928) was a National Democratic and Labour Party Member of Parliament (MP) representing Wallsend, from 1918 to 1922.

References

External links 
 

1869 births
1928 deaths
UK MPs 1918–1922
Members of the Parliament of the United Kingdom for English constituencies
National Democratic and Labour Party MPs
National Liberal Party (UK, 1922) politicians